Reedy may refer to:Roberta Reedy

Artifact
Reedy Point Bridge in Delaware

People
 Chuck Reedy, a former American football player and coach
 Edward K. Reedy, a director of the Georgia Tech Research Institute
 George Reedy, White House Press Secretary
 Hanara Tangiawha Te Ohaki Reedy, a New Zealand tribal leader
 Jamil El Reedy, a retired Egypt ian alpine skier
 Materoa Reedy, a New Zealand tribal leader
 Paul Reedy, an Australian rower
 Thomas E. Reedy, a politician from South Dakota
 Thomas Reedy, convicted child pornography trafficker.  See Operation Avalanche (child pornography crackdown)
 William Marion Reedy,  a St. Louis-based editor
 Winston Reedy, Reggae singer

Places
Antarctica
 Reedy Glacier

Australia
 Reedy Lake, Victoria
 Reedy, Western Australia

United States
 Reedy, West Virginia
 Reedy Island, Delaware
 Reedy River, South Carolina

See also
 Reedy Creek (disambiguation)